

This is a list of the Pennsylvania state historical markers in Berks County.

This is intended to be a complete list of the official state historical markers placed in Berks County, Pennsylvania by the Pennsylvania Historical and Museum Commission (PHMC). The locations of the historical markers, as well as the latitude and longitude coordinates as provided by the PHMC's database, are included below when available. There are 66 historical markers located in Berks County.

Historical markers

See also

 List of Pennsylvania state historical markers
 National Register of Historic Places listings in Berks County, Pennsylvania

References

External links
 Pennsylvania Historical Marker Program
 Pennsylvania Historical & Museum Commission

Pennsylvania state historical markers in Berks County
Berks County
Pennsylvania state historical markers in Berks County
Tourist attractions in Berks County, Pennsylvania